Events from the year 1780 in Scotland.

Incumbents

Law officers 
 Lord Advocate – Henry Dundas; 
 Solicitor General for Scotland – Alexander Murray

Judiciary 
 Lord President of the Court of Session – Lord Arniston, the younger
 Lord Justice General – The Viscount Stormont
 Lord Justice Clerk – Lord Barskimming

Events 
 31 May – James Watt patents a copying machine.
 18 December –  the Society of Antiquaries of Scotland is formed.
 Dalmally Bridge built.
 Böd of Gremista built in Lerwick.
 Approximate date
 James Small produces a two-horse swing plough using Carron Company iron.
 Kilcalmonell Parish Church at Clachan, Kintyre, is rebuilt.

Births 
 26 February – Alexander Allan, shipowner (died 1854)
 17 March – Thomas Chalmers, Free Church leader (died 1847)
 3 April – Walter Newall, architect and civil engineer (died 1863)
 10 October – John Abercrombie, physician and philosopher (died 1844)
 16 November – Robert Archibald Smith, composer (died 1829)
 5 December – Patrick Sellar, lawyer, factor and sheep farmer instrumental in the Highland Clearances (died 1851)
 26 December – Mary Somerville, née Fairfax, mathematician (died 1872 in Naples)
 David Buchan, naval officer and Arctic explorer (lost at sea 1838)
 Colquhoun Grant, British Army officer (died 1829 in Aachen)
 William Laird, shipbuilder (died 1841 in Birkenhead)
 Robert Pinkerton, Bible missionary (died 1859 in Reigate)
 Andrew Wilson, landscape painter (died 1848)

Deaths 
 7 October – Patrick Ferguson, British Army officer and designer of the Ferguson rifle (born 1744; killed in Battle of Kings Mountain)
 26 November – Sir James Steuart Denham, economist (born 1712)

Sport 
 Royal Aberdeen Golf Club founded as the 'Society of Golfers at Aberdeen'.

See also 

Timeline of Scottish history

References 

 
Years of the 18th century in Scotland
Scotland
1780s in Scotland